"Out of Love" is a song by American rapper Lil Tecca featuring hip-hop collective Internet Money, released on April 17, 2020, as the lead single from Tecca's debut studio album, Virgo World. The track is produced by Saint Luca Beats, Taz Taylor, TheSkyBeats and Repko.

Background 
"Out of Love" was initially intended as the lead single from a collaboration project between Tecca and Internet Money titled Do They Really Love You. However, the project was not released and the single ended up appearing on Tecca's debut studio album, Virgo World.

Critical reception 
Erika Marie of HotNewHipHop called the song's hook "catchy".

Music video 
The official music video for the track was released on June 30, 2020. The video was directed by Omar Jones.

Charts

References 

2020 singles
2020 songs
Lil Tecca songs
Songs written by Lil Tecca